The 2019 Spa World RX of Benelux was the third round of the sixth season of the FIA World Rallycross Championship. The event was held at the Circuit de Spa-Francorchamps in Francorchamps, Belgium.

Niclas Grönholm has missed this round due to undergo an Appendicitis operation in Finland. Joni Wiman, who originally was planned to drive a third car, replace him as teams' championship scorer, and the team switch back to two cars.

Supercar 

Source

Heats

Semi-finals 

 Semi-Final 1

 Semi-Final 2

Final

Standings after the event 

Source

 Note: Only the top five positions are included.

References 

|- style="text-align:center"
|width="35%"|Previous race:2019 World RX of Catalunya
|width="40%"|FIA World Rallycross Championship2019 season
|width="35%"|Next race:2019 World RX of Great Britain
|- style="text-align:center"
|width="35%"|Previous race:2018 World RX of Belgium
|width="40%"|World RX of Benelux
|width="35%"|Next race:2021 World RX of Benelux
|- style="text-align:center"

Belgium
World RX
World RX